Skalmen Lighthouse is a coastal lighthouse located in Smøla Municipality, Møre og Romsdal county, Norway.

History
The lighthouse was established in 1907 and automated in 2002. The main light on top of the lighthouse emits one white flash every 30 seconds. The secondary light emits a red light: 2 seconds on and then 2 seconds off. The site is only accessible by boat.

See also

Lighthouses in Norway
List of lighthouses in Norway

References

External links
 Norsk Fyrhistorisk Forening 

Lighthouses completed in 1907
Lighthouses in Møre og Romsdal
Smøla